You All Look the Same to Me is Archive's third studio album. In this album Archive used Craig Walker for vocals and gradually turned away from their roots in electronica and trip hop and towards more psychedelic and progressive style of bands such as Pink Floyd, Mogwai and The Secret Machines. This album is Archive's first album with their new vocalist Craig Walker, formerly of Power of Dreams, a pop/rock band built around him and Keith Walker.

Track listing

 "Again" – 16:21
 "Numb" – 5:48
 "Meon" – 5:45
 "Goodbye" – 5:40
 "Now and Then" – 1:24
 "Seamless" – 1:45
 "Finding It So Hard" – 15:35
 "Fool" – 8:31
 "Hate" – 3:45
 "Need" – 2:26

Limited Edition bonus tracks:

 "Absurd" – 5:00
 "Junkie Shuffle" – 10:40
 "Sham" – 5:05
 "Men Like You" – 3:56

Charts

Weekly charts

Year-end charts

Certifications

References

Archive (band) albums
2002 albums